Gamerabaena is an extinct genus of baenid turtle which existed in North Dakota during the late Cretaceous Period. It is known from a single fragmentary skull that was found in the Maastrichtian-age Hell Creek Formation. It contains the species Gamerabaena sonsalla. Gamerabaena is similar to the genus Palatobaena, but it differs in its lack of a posterior expansion of the triturating (or chewing) surface, a somewhat rectangular skull, and a wide angle between the maxillae. Gamerabaena also has a lingual ridge on the inner side of the jaw that is not seen in Palatobaena.

Gamerabaena is considered the sister taxon of Palatobaena and shares features with both Palatobaena and Plesiobaena. These features, which include slightly upturned eye sockets, are seen as intermediate between the two other genera. While Gamerabaena is known only from the skull, it may belong to the same species as "Baena" hayi, which is known primarily from the shell.

The genus is named after Gamera, a giant flying, fire-breathing turtle from a series of Japanese tokusatsu films.

Phylogeny 
Cladogram after Tyler R. Lyson and Walter G. Joyce (2009).

See also 

 Sinemys gamera – another species of fossil turtle named after Gamera

References

Baenidae
Prehistoric turtle genera
Late Cretaceous turtles of North America
Hell Creek fauna
Fossil taxa described in 2010